Qarah Saqqal-e Sofla (also Romanized as Qarah Sāqqāl-e Soflá; also known as Mo‘aţţal) is a village in Qeshlaq-e Jonubi Rural District, Qeshlaq Dasht District, Bileh Savar County, Ardabil Province, Iran. At the 2006 census, its population was 20, in 6 families.

References 

Towns and villages in Bileh Savar County